{{Infobox character
| colour = Yellow
| name = Smudge
| series = Monica's Gang's
| image = Smudge su.jpg
| image_size = 140px
| caption = Smudge 7 years in Monica's Gang (top) and Smudge 15 years in Monica Adventures (bottom)
| first =  Removable Newspaper strips of 1961
| creator = Maurício de Sousa
| portrayer = Gabriel Moreira (Monica and Friends: Bonds)
| voice = Isaura Gomes Feliz Natal pra Todos - As Aventuras da Turma da Mônica)Paulo Cavalcante (A Turma da Mônica em A Princesa e o Robô-present)
| gender = Male
| family = Mrs. Lurdinha (mother), Mr. Antenor (father), Captain Fray (uncle), Chauvy (pet pig), Dustine (girlfriend)
| species = Human
| full_name = Cássio Marques Ferreira Cordeiro de Araújo
| origin = Mogi das Cruzes – SP, Brazil
}}
Cassius, known as Smudge (originally Cascão – Portuguese for a dirt layer that may appear on the human skin when not washed frequently - in the Brazilian version) is one of the main characters of Monica's Gang. He was created in 1961 and since 1982 has his own printed comics appearing weekly on the newsagents. Mauricio de Sousa, his creator, says he based the character on a child he knew while growing up in Mogi das Cruzes. The child was a friend of his brother Márcio, and was also not too hygienic. Since the friendship did not last, Mauricio never recalled his real name.

The reason why he is called Smudge or Cascão is because he never takes a bath. Smudge hates water and never, ever touches it. Smudge is well known for being creative and having interesting ideas. He assists Jimmy Five in his 'Infallible Plans'.

He received his own comic book in 1982 and is being published today.

 Characteristics 
Smudge is best known for his great fear of water, and because of that, has never, throughout the entire series, taken a bath. However, he was once illegally portrayed taking a shower in a TV commercial for a Brazilian showerhead manufacturer. He was once also drawn carrying a bundle of clothes and cookies under heavy rain and in water up to his waist for a short story in a time when Southern Brazil was suffering a heavy rain season. He fears rain, bodies of water, showers and taps. He also doesn't drink pure water, although he drinks juices and eats soup. To protect himself, he always carries an umbrella with him, for any possible emergency. In some strips, Smudge is even able to fly to run from water.

Smudge's personality was, initially, of a "garbage addict"; but he became a person who recycles old stuff in order to make new toys to play with. He used to visit the garbage deposit everyday, but since the last few years, he doesn't go there anymore. He is the gang's handyman, often fixing the other kids' broken toys.

Jimmy Five's best friend, he is always convinced or even blackmailed to participate in his "infallible plans", even though in the end he is always the one to mess everything up because he always lets the cat out of the bag. He dates Dustine (Cascuda) - a girl who hates water just like him but takes a bath every few stories, unlike Smudge.

In Monica Adventure's Teen, Smudge is known to take a bath occasionally.

Smudge loves soccer, a recurring theme in his strips. A supporter of Corinthians, he is the only character who supports the same club in every strip. Jimmy Five, for example, has been described both as a São Paulo or a Palmeiras supporter, despite recent descriptions now preferring Palmeiras, with São Paulo becoming Monica's team.

 Related characters 
 Seu Antenor (Mr. Antenor) – Smudge's father,  an avid Corinthians supporter just like his son. He sometimes tries to convince his son to take a bath, with no results. He spends the weekends with Smudge, and sometimes with his friend Seu Cebola and Jimmy Five, and sometimes both Cebola and Antenor even force Jimmy and Smudge to do what they enjoyed when younger.
 Dona Lurdinha (Mrs. Lurdinha) – Smudge's mother. Just like her husband, she tries hard to convince her son to take a bath, but the results are the same. She eventually tries to force Smudge to take a bath, using brute force, but there's always something to save Smudge from what he calls "death".
 Captain Fray (Capitão Feio, lit. "Captain Ugly") – One of Monica's Gang main enemies. He was once Smudge's uncle, but went mad and decided to be as dirty as his nephew. He lives in the underworld of the sewer system and leads a large army of "dirty beings", monsters made of dirt. He also has superpowers: Apart from flying, he can release dirt beams, move objects from a distance, or create objects using dust. Water works on him just like kryptonite works on Superman: Once he's wet, all his powers are gone. His dream is to make the entire world a dirtier place to live, and also to rule it. However, Monica and her friends always find a way to stop him. Captain somewhat has a good feeling towards Smudge, occasionally. He sometimes is the one to save him from any contact with water. On the other hand, there are strips in which he wants to destroy Smudge for Smudge being the dirtier being in the universe, a status that Captain desires.
 Chauvy (Chovinista) – Smudge's pet, this small pig hates water as much as  his owner, but is sometimes seen taking a bath.
 Dustine (Cascuda'') – Smudge's girlfriend. Although she was created only to be Smudge's lover, he sometimes chases other girls.

Legacy 
In 2002 the football player Ronaldo made a haircut inspired by Smudge playing well during the 2002 FIFA World Cup. The hairstyle consisted of the hair Smudge cut in the forehead region player format while the rest of the hair was all shaved, became popular among fans at the time. This was acknowledged in an advertisement for Guaraná Antarctica aired shortly after the World Cup, in which Smudge and Ronaldo interact with each other.

References

External links 
Official Monica's Gang website 

Monica's Gang
Fictional characters based on real people
Fictional Brazilian people
Child characters in comics
Child characters in television
Comics characters introduced in 1961
Comics characters who can move at superhuman speeds
Animated human characters
Fictional association football players
Comic book sidekicks